Cobden-Sanderson may refer to:

 Anne Cobden-Sanderson (1853–1926), British socialist, suffragette and vegetarian; wife of T. J. Cobden-Sanderson
 T. J. Cobden-Sanderson (1840–1922), English artist and bookbinder; husband of Anne Cobden-Sanderson

See also
 Cobden (disambiguation)
 Sanderson (disambiguation)